The 1965–66 Women's European Champions Cup was the 6th edition of the Europe's competition for national champions women's handball clubs, taking place from 9 January to 16 April 1966.

HC Copenhague entered the competition as title holder, after beating in past season's final Budapesti Spartacus. Copenhague reached once again the final, but this year the Danish team was defeated by SC Leipzig. It was the first time that an East-German team won the title.

Qualifying stage

Quarter-finals

Semi-finals

Final

|}

References

European Cup women
European Cup women
Women's EHF Champions League
Eur
Eur